Gusyovka is a rural locality (a selo) and the administrative center of Gusyovskoye Rural Settlement, Olkhovsky District, Volgograd Oblast, Russia. The population was 1,262 as of 2010. There are 17 streets.

Geography 
Gusyovka is located 23 km northwest of Olkhovka (the district's administrative centre) by road. Zaburunny is the nearest rural locality.

References 

Rural localities in Olkhovsky District
Tsaritsynsky Uyezd